The Salem Formation is a geologic formation in Illinois, Indiana, Kentucky, and Missouri. It preserves fossils dating back to the Mississippian subperiod. This formation is quarried and used as a building material, known as "Indiana limestone", also called Bedford limestone.

See also
 List of fossiliferous stratigraphic units in Illinois
 List of fossiliferous stratigraphic units in Indiana
 List of fossiliferous stratigraphic units in Kentucky
 List of fossiliferous stratigraphic units in Missouri

References

 

Mississippian Illinois
Geologic formations of Indiana
Geologic formations of Missouri
Carboniferous Kentucky
Carboniferous southern paleotropical deposits